Robert Milne may refer to:

Robert Menli Lyon (1789–c. 1863), Scottish-born humanitarian, born Robert Milne
Bob Milne (footballer) (1870–1932), Scottish-born footballer who played for Ireland
Robert Milne (cricketer, born 1960), English cricketer
Robert Milne (cricketer, born 1852) (1852–1927), English cricketer
Robert Milne (Canadian politician) (1881–1953), Member of Parliament
Robert Duncan Milne (1844–1899), American science fiction writer
Robert Milne (telecommunications consultant), see Inmos

See also
Bob Milne, American musician
Robert Mylne (disambiguation)